Makhori is a village in Bhind district in Madhya Pradesh. Makhori is located at a distance of 2 km from Guhisar   in east direction on Gwalior-Baragaon-Bilara Road.

References

Villages in Bhind district